The men's kumite +84 kilograms competition at the 2010 Asian Games in Guangzhou, China was held on 24 November 2010 at the Guangdong Gymnasium.

Schedule
All times are China Standard Time (UTC+08:00)

Results
Legend
H — Won by hansoku

Main bracket

Repechage

References

External links
Official website

Men's kumite 85 kg